Palbongsan  is a mountain in Chungcheongnam-do, western South Korea.

See also
List of mountains of Korea

References

Mountains of South Korea
Mountains of South Chungcheong Province